This is a summary of the year 2017 in British music.

Events
12 January – The City of London Corporation announces a pledge of £2.5M to a feasibility study, previously halted in November 2016, for a proposed new London concert hall.
17 January – UK Music announced that Jo Dipple is to stand down as its CEO in June 2017.
18 January – Scottish Opera announces the winners of its 'Opera Sparks 2018' competition:
 Henry McPherson – Maud
 Lewis Murphy and Laura Attridge – untitled work
Matthew Whiteside and Helene Grøn – Little Black Lies
25 January
 The London Festival of Baroque Music announces that Lindsay Kemp is to stand down as artistic director, and Lucy Bending is to stand down as festival manager, in May 2017, at the conclusion of the 2017 festival.
 The Chamber Music Society of Lincoln Center announces its award of the 2017 Elise L. Stoeger Prize, for contributions to chamber music composition, to Huw Watkins.
27 January – Lucie Jones is selected to represent the United Kingdom in the Eurovision Song Contest 2017, with the song "Never Give Up on You", co-written by Denmark's 2013 Eurovision winner Emmelie de Forest.
12 February – 59th Annual Grammy Awards (see Awards section)
13 February – The European Union Baroque Orchestra (EUBO), currently with its administrative base in Hordley, announces its intention to relocate to AMUZ (Augustinus Muziekzentrum), Antwerp, in 2018, in the wake of the Brexit referendum.  In parallel, the EUBO announces its plan to discontinue the EUBO Mobile Baroque Academy (EMBA) project at the end of March 2017.
28 February – The St Paul's Cathedral Choir announces the appointment of Carris Jones to its roster, the first female chorister in the choir's recorded history, effective 1 September 2017, as alto vicar choral.
1 March – Birmingham Conservatoire and Birmingham School of Acting announce that the two institutions are to merge, effective September 2017.
2 March
 The Academy of Ancient Music announces the appointment of Alexander Van Ingen as its new chief executive.
 The BBC announces the appointment of Neil Ferris as the new chorus director of the BBC Symphony Chorus, effective May 2017.  In parallel, Grace Rossiter is to join the chorus as deputy chorus director.
8 March – New Music Scotland presented the inaugural Scottish Awards for New Music:
5 April – The Southbank Centre announces the appointment of Elaine Bedell as its next chief executive, the first woman to hold the post, effective May 2017.
 18 April – Opera North announces the resignation of Aleksandar Marković as its music director, with his contract formally to terminate in July 2017, but where he is not to appear with the company for the remainder of the 2016–2017 season.
2 May – The Leeds International Piano Competition announces that Murray Perahia is to be its new patron, effective 1 June 2017.
9 May – The BBC announces the appointment of Sofi Jeannin as the next chief conductor of the BBC Singers, the first woman to be named to the post, effective July 2018.
13 May – The UK finishes 15th in the final of the Eurovision Song Contest 2017 with 111 points.
22 May – At a concert by American Pop Star Ariana Grande at the Manchester Arena, 22 people are killed in a suicide bomber attack.
25 May – The Royal Scottish National Orchestra (RSNO) announces the appointment of Thomas Søndergård as its next principal conductor, effective with the 2018–2019 season.  In parallel, Peter Oundjian is to conclude his music directorship of the RSNO at the close of the 2017–2018 season.
4 June – At the Old Trafford Cricket Ground, the One Love Manchester benefit concert takes place, to benefit the victims of the Manchester Arena bombing. The performers included Ariana Grande, Katy Perry, Coldplay, Justin Bieber, Robbie Williams, Chris Martin, Liam Gallagher, and Marcus Mumford.
7 June – Glyndebourne Opera announces the appointment of Nicholas Jenkins as its new chorus master, effective 4 September 2017.
9–11 June – Download Festival 2017 takes place at Donington Park in Leicestershire. The main stage was headlined by System of a Down, Biffy Clyro and Aerosmith, the Zippo encore stage by Sum 41, Rob Zombie and Slayer, the Avalanche stage by Sleeping with Sirens, Simple Plan and The Dillinger Escape Plan (in their final UK appearance), and the Dogtooth stage by Exodus, Wednesday 13 and Perturbator.
12 June – Queen's Birthday Honours
 Sir Mark Elder and Sir Paul McCartney are each made a Companion of Honour.
 Sarah Connolly is made a Dame Commander of the Order of the British Empire.
 George Benjamin is made a Knight Bachelor.
 Chi-chi Nwanoku and Roderick Williams are each made an Officer of the Order of the British Empire.
 Gerald Finley is made a Commander of the Order of the British Empire.
19 June – The BBC Cardiff Singer of the World competition results are announced:
 Main Prize – Catriona Morison (the first-ever British winner of the Main Prize in the history of the competition)
 Song Prize – Catriona Morison and Ariunbaatar Ganbaatar (joint prize winners)
 Audience Prize – Louise Alder
22 June – The Royal College of Music Philharmonic Orchestra presents a benefit concert for residents left homeless after the Grenfell Tower fire.
26 June – The Royal Philharmonic Orchestra announces that Charles Dutoit is to stand down as its principal conductor, and to take the title of Honorary Conductor for Life, in 2019.
27 June – Arts Council England (ACE) reports its national portfolio funding decisions for the scheduled period of 2018–2022, which include the following music-related items:
 Re-admission of English National Opera to portfolio funding, at £12.4 million per year
 First-time funding for the British Paraorchestra
 3% diminished funding for the Royal Opera House, Covent Garden, and the Southbank Centre, per ACE's specific request
30 July – At The Proms at the Royal Albert Hall, Xian Zhang conducts the annual Prom which includes the Symphony No. 9 of Beethoven, the first woman conductor ever to do so.
9 August 
 The Reverend David Ingall of the St Sepulchre-without-Newgate Church in London (known as the National Musicians' Church) announces that the church is to close its hiring programme and acceptance of new bookings effective 2018.
 Music Theatre Wales announces the appointment of Richard Baker as its consultant music director, with immediate effect.
15 August – The Royal Philharmonic Society announces Charles Dutoit as the recipient of the 103rd RPS Gold Medal.  The RPS presented Dutoit with the medal at 17 August 2017 performance by the Royal Philharmonic Orchestra at The Proms, at the Royal Albert Hall.
21 September – English National Opera announces that Cressida Pollock is to stand down as its chief executive in June 2018.
11 October – The European Union Youth Orchestra announces its intention to relocate its administrative functions to Ferrara and Rome, Italy, in the wake of the Brexit referendum.
23 November – The BBC Concert Orchestra announces the appointment of Bramwell Tovey as its next principal conductor, effective January 2018, with an initial contract of 5 years.  In parallel, Keith Lockhart is to stand down from the principal conductorship of the BBC Concert Orchestra, and to take the title of chief guest conductor.
28 November – The Association of British Orchestras (ABO) announces the election of Gavin Reid as its new chair.
4 December – Glyndebourne Opera announces that Sebastian F. Schwarz is to conclude his tenure as its general director in 2018.
5 December – The Royal Philharmonic Society announces that Rosemary Johnson is to stand down as its executive director in the summer of 2018.
15 December
 The Cheltenham Music Festival announces the appointment of Alison Balsom as its next artistic director, effective in 2018, the first woman to hold the post.
 Sinfonia Cymru announces the appointment of Peter Bellingham as its next chief executive.  In parallel, Sophie Lewis is to stand down as the ensemble's chief executive at the end of January 2018.
21 December — The Royal Philharmonic Orchestra announces the cancellation of concert appearances by principal conductor and artistic director Charles Dutoit, pending the resolution of allegations of sexual assault against him.
29 December — New Year's Honours 2018
 Barry Gibb and Ringo Starr are each made a Knight Bachelor.
 Jonathan Freeman-Attwood is made a Commander of the Order of the British Empire.
 Sarah Alexander, Marc Almond, and are each made an Officer of the Order of the British Empire.
 Richard Cowie, Anthony Marwood, Bazil Meade, David Temple Nigel Tully, and Cleveland Watkiss are each made a Member of the Order of the British Empire.

Television programmes
7 January – Let It Shine (BBC1), hosted by Graham Norton and Mel Giedroyc, with Gary Barlow, Dannii Minogue and Martin Kemp serving as judges throughout the series.
13 January – Sound of Musicals with Neil Brand (BBC4)
23 March – The Last Days of George Michael (Channel 5)
7 May – Babs (BBC1), biopic of Barbara Windsor
June – The Voice Kids (ITV), hosted by Emma Willis
2 October – Tunes for Tyrants (BBC4), presented by Suzy Klein

Artists and groups reformed 
 Bananarama
 Elastica
 Friendly Fires
 Jethro Tull
 Orbital
 Sleeper
 Steps
 The Streets
 The KLF
 Viva Brother

Groups on hiatus 
 Disclosure
One Direction

Groups disbanded 
Black Sabbath
Brontide
Heaven's Basement
The Maccabees
The Stone Roses
Stornoway
Vant
We Are the Ocean
Wild Beasts
Xerath

Classical works
 Richard Allain – Videte Miraculum
 Julian Anderson – The Imaginary Museum (Piano Concerto)
 Kerry Andrew – Archbishop Parker's Psalme 150
 John Barber – Sicut Lilium
 Gerald Barry – Canada
 Sally Beamish and David Harsent – The Judas Passion
 Judith Bingham – Ceaselessly Weaving Your Name
 Harrison Birtwistle – Deep Time
 Charlotte Bray – Blaze and Fall
 Ken Burton – Many are the wonders
 Philip Cashian – Piano Concerto ('The Book of Ingenious Devices')
 John Casken – Clarinet Quintet
 Anna Clyne – Beltane
 Marisa Cornford – The Stations of the Cross
 Tom Coult
 Two Games and a Nocturne
 St John's Dance
 Lyell Cresswell – Llanto (Clarinet Concerto)
 Gordon Crosse – Symphony No 3 ('Between Despair and Dawn')
 Tansy Davies – Forest (Concerto for four horns and orchestra)
 Jonathan Dove – Vadam et circuibo
 Brian Elias
 Oboe Quartet
 Cello Concerto
 Harry Escott – O Light of Light
 Edmund Finnis – The Air, Tuning
 Graham Fitkin – Recorder Concerto
 Alexander Goehr – The Waking
 Lori Goldston – That Sunrise (for cello and orchestra)
 Michael Zev Gordon – Violin Concerto
 Helen Grime
 Piano Concerto
 Fanfare
 Emily Hall – Advert – wedding dress
 Alexandra Harwood – Sinfonia Concertante (The Secret Ball)
 Simon Holt – Bagatelarañas
 Gabriel Jackson – Chorale Prelude on 'Herzliebster Jesu, was hast du verbrochen'
 Joel Jarventausta – Cantus
 Hannah Kendall – The Spark Catchers
 Oliver Knussen – O Hototogisu – fragment of a Japonisme
 Guillermo Lago – The Wordsworth Poems
 Nicola LeFanu – The Crimson Bird
 Joanna Marsh – Flare
 Grace Evangeline Mason – RIVER
 Robert Matthew-Walker – A Bad Night in Los Angeles
 Colin Matthews – It Rains
 Stuart McIntosh – A Song for St. Cecilia's Day
 Giulia Monducci – Versus
 Alasdair Nicolson – Piano Concerto No 2 (The Haunted Ebb)
 Roxanna Panufnik – Unending Love
 Ben Parry – Out of the Deep
 Joseph Phibbs – Clarinet Concerto
 Julian Philips – Winter Music
 Francis Pott – La chiesa del sole – in memoriam John Scott
Deborah Pritchard – Edge
 Gabriel Prokofiev – Concerto for trumpet, percussion, turntables and orchestra
 Robert Quinney – Chorale Prelude on 'Nun lob, mein' Seel', den Herren'
 Emma-Ruth Richards – Sciamachy
 Colin Riley – Double Concerto for Two Cellos
 Sarah Rimkus – Mater Dei
 Alec Roth – Night Prayer
 Simon Rowland-Jones – Close Shave
 Edwin Roxburgh – Concerto for Piano and Wind Orchestra
 Oliver Rudland – Eventide
 Andy Scott – Guitar Concerto
 Thomas Simaku – The Scream
 Giles Swayne – Everybloom
 William Sweeney – Eòlas nan Ribheid (The Wisdom of the Reeds; concertino for clarinet and orchestra)
 Dobrinka Tabakova – Orpheus' Comet
 Matthew Taylor – Goddess Excellently Bright
 Mark-Anthony Turnage 
 Remembering (In Memoriam Evan Scofield)
 Col
 Freya Waley-Cohen – String Quartet
 Joanna Ward – She Adored
 Huw Watkins – Symphony
 Kate Whitley (music) and Malala Yousafzai (text) – Speak Out
 Roderick Williams – 'Là ci darem la mano'

Opera
 Danyal Dhondy and Nick Pitts-Tucker – Shahrazad
 Louis Mander and Stephen Fry – The Life to Come
 Noah Mosley and Ivo Mosley – Mad King Suibhne
 Roxanna Panufnik and Jessica Duchen – Silver Birch
 Lliam Paterson
 The 8th Door
 BambinO
 Julian Philips and Stephen Plaice – The Tale of Januarie
 Guto Puw and Gwyneth Glyn – Y Tŵr
 Snow (opera in three acts with music by three composers; libretto by JL Williams):
 Act I: Lewis Murphy (music) – 'Three Ravens'
 Act II: Lucie Treacher (music) – 'The Death of the Seven Dwarves'
 Act III: Tom Floyd (music) – 'The Crystal Casket'
 Ryan Wigglesworth – The Winter's Tale

Musical theatre
The Band by Tim Firth, based on the music of Take That.
Fat Friends The Musical by Kay Mellor and Nick Lloyd Webber
Nativity! The Musical, written and directed by Debbie Isitt, and co-composed by Nicky Ager

Film scores and incidental music

Film
Harry Gregson-Williams – The Zookeeper's Wife
Daniel Pemberton – King Arthur: Legend of the Sword
Max Richter – The Sense of an Ending

Television
Dan Jones – SS-GB, The Replacement
Carly Paradis – Prime Suspect 1973
Max Richter – Taboo
Kevin Sargent – Tina and Bobby

Awards

British music awards
Brit Awards – see 2017 Brit Awards
 Royal Philharmonic Society Awards
 Audiences and Engagement: East Neuk Festival, in collaboration with 14–18 NOW – Memorial Ground (David Lang)
 Chamber Music and Song: Fretwork
 Chamber-Scale Composition: Rebecca Saunders – Skin
 Concert Series and Festivals: Lammermuir Festival 
 Conductor: Richard Farnes
 Creative Communication: Beethoven for a Later Age: The Journey of a String Quartet by Edward Dusinberre (Faber)
 Ensemble: Manchester Camerata
 Instrumentalist: James Ehnes
 Large-Scale Composition: Philip Venables – 4.48 Psychosis
 Learning and Participation: South-West Open Youth Orchestra
 Opera and Music Theatre: Opera North – Ring Cycle
 Singer: Karita Mattila
 Young Artists: Joseph Middleton
Scottish Awards for New Music:
 Achievement in New Music: Allie Robertson
 Award for Community / Education Project: Drake Music Scotland – 'Wagner's School of Cool'
 Large Scale Work: Helen Grime – Two Eardley Pictures: Catterline in Winter and Snow
 New Music Performer(s) of the Year: Red Note Ensemble
 Recorded New Work: Robert Irvine, Songs and Lullabies (Delphian Records)
 Small/medium Scale Work: David Fennessy – Panopticon

Grammy awards
 Album of the Year – 25, Adele
 Song of the Year – 'Hello', Adele
 Best Pop Solo Performance – 'Hello', Adele
 Best Pop Vocal Album – 25, Adele
 Best Rock Performance – Blackstar, David Bowie
 Best Rock Song – 'Blackstar', David Bowie
 Best Alternative Music Album – Blackstar, David Bowie
 Best Recording Package – Blackstar
 Best Engineered Album, Non-Classical – Blackstar
 Best Classical Solo Vocal Album (tie)
 Shakespeare Songs, Ian Bostridge and Sir Antonio Pappano
 Schumann & Berg, Dorothea Röschmann and Dame Mitsuko Uchida

Charts

Number-one singles
The singles chart includes a proportion for streaming.

Number-one albums
The albums chart includes a proportion for streaming.

Top singles of the year
This chart was published by the Official Charts Company in January 2018

Best-selling albums

Deaths
8 January – Peter Sarstedt, singer, songwriter, and musician, 75
12 January – Larry Steinbachek, keyboardist (Bronski Beat), 56 (cancer) (death announced on this date)
18 January – Mike Kellie, drummer (Spooky Tooth), composer and record producer, 69
22 January – Pete Overend Watts, bass guitarist (Mott The Hoople), 69 (throat cancer)
28 January – Geoff Nicholls, keyboardist (Black Sabbath), lung cancer, 68
31 January 
 Deke Leonard, rock guitarist (Man), 72
 John Schroeder, easy listening composer, arranger, songwriter (Sounds Orchestral) and record producer, 82
 John Wetton, singer, songwriter, bassist (Asia, King Crimson, Uriah Heep), colon cancer, 67
3 February – Gervase de Peyer, clarinetist, 90
12 February - Damian, singer, musician, cancer, 52
17 February – Peter Skellern, singer-songwriter, 69
13 March – John Lever, drummer (The Chameleons), 55
27 March – Clem Curtis, Trinidadian British singer (The Foundations),76
9 April – Alan Henderson, bassist (Them), 72
10 April – David Angel, British violinist and founding member of the Maggini Quartet, 62
11 April
 Eric Cook, heavy metal band manager (Venom) and record label executive, co-founder of Demolition Records, 55 (cancer)
 Toby Smith, keyboardist, songwriter, producer (Jamiroquai), cancer, 46
13 April – Nona Liddell, violinist, 89
15 April – Allan Holdsworth, guitarist and composer (Bruford, U.K., Soft Machine), 70
18 April – Gordon Langford, British composer, 86
28 April – George Pratt, organist and music professor, 82
2 May – Norma Proctor, contralto, 89
5 May – Clive Brooks, drummer (Egg, The Groundhogs), 67
13 May – Jimmy Copley, drummer (Jeff Beck, Graham Parker, Tears for Fears), 63 (leukaemia)
29 May – David Lewiston, music collector, 88
2 June 
 Malcolm Lipkin, composer, 85
 Sir Jeffrey Tate, conductor, 74 (heart attack)
6 June – Vin Garbutt, folk singer, 69 (complications following heart surgery)
14 June – Deborah Lamprell, opera house staff member at Holland Park Opera, 45
15 June – Kyla Greenbaum, pianist and composer, 95
13 July – John Dalby, pianist and composer, 88
5 August – Lee Blakeley, opera director, 45
28 August – Melissa Bell, singer (Soul II Soul), 53
6 September – Derek Bourgeois, composer, 75
7 September – John Maxwell Geddes, composer, 76
11 September – Sir Peter Hall, theatre and opera director, 86
22 September – Mike Carr, jazz organist and pianist, 79
28 September – Donald Mitchell, musicologist, 92
30 September – Apex (Robert Dickeson), music producer, 36
16 October
 Iain Shedden, Scottish-Australian musician and journalist, 60 (laryngeal cancer)
 Heather Slade-Lipkin, pianist, harpsichordist and teacher, 70
19 October – Phil Miller, musician, 68
22 October – George Young, British-born Australian musician, songwriter and producer, 70
27 October – Brian Galliford, British tenor, 53
13 November – Paul Brown, British opera and theatre stage designer, 57
7 November – Paul Buckmaster, arranger and composer, Grammy winner (2002), 71
18 November – Malcolm Young, Scottish-born Australian Hall of Fame guitarist and songwriter (AC/DC), 64 (complications from dementia)
11 December – Bruce Rankin, British tenor, 65
15 December – John Critchinson, jazz pianist, 82

See also 
 2017 in British radio
 2017 in British television
 2017 in the United Kingdom
 List of British films of 2017

Notes

References 

 
2017